John George Saunders (1 December 1950 – 4 January 1998) was a professional footballer, who played for Mansfield Town, Huddersfield Town, Barnsley, Lincoln City, Doncaster Rovers and Worksop Town.

References

External links
Lincoln City profile
Doncaster Rovers profile

1950 births
1998 deaths
English footballers
Footballers from Worksop
Association football defenders
English Football League players
Mansfield Town F.C. players
Huddersfield Town A.F.C. players
Barnsley F.C. players
Lincoln City F.C. players
Doncaster Rovers F.C. players
Worksop Town F.C. players